Edwin Douglas Cartland (July 20, 1914 - July 29, 2002) was a male United States international table tennis player. 

He won a three bronze medals at the World Table Tennis Championships; two at the 1949 World Table Tennis Championships in the men's team and in the men's doubles with Dick Miles.  His third bronze came in 1952 at the 1952 World Table Tennis Championships in the men's doubles with Marty Reisman.

He was inducted into the USA Table Tennis Hall of Fame in 1984 and in 1953 the Barnes Sports Library published his book called 'Table Tennis Illustrated'.

See also
 List of table tennis players
 List of World Table Tennis Championships medalists

References

American male table tennis players
1914 births
2002 deaths
World Table Tennis Championships medalists
20th-century American people